The year 1876 in science and technology involved some significant events, listed below.

Astronomy
 December 7 – First recorded observation of the Great White Spot on Saturn, made by American astronomer Asaph Hall, who uses it to calculate the planet's rotation period.

Biology
 Robert Koch demonstrates that Bacillus anthracis is the source of anthrax, the first bacterium conclusively shown to cause disease.
 Koller's sickle in avian gastrulation is first described by August Rauber.
 Francis Galton invents the silent dog whistle.
 Meiosis was discovered and described for the first time in sea urchin eggs by the German biologist Oscar Hertwig.

Chemistry
 Josiah Willard Gibbs publishes On the Equilibrium of Heterogeneous Substances, a compilation of his work on thermodynamics and physical chemistry which lays out the concept of free energy to explain the physical basis of chemical equilibria.

Exploration
 May 24 – End of the Challenger expedition.

Mathematics
 Édouard Lucas demonstrates that 127 is a Mersenne prime, the largest that will be recorded for seventy-five years. He also shows that the Mersenne number 267 − 1, or M67, must have factors.

Medicine
 February 22 – Swedish woman Karolina Olsson lapses into a form of hibernation for 32 years.
 David Ferrier publishes The Functions of the Brain.
 William Macewen demonstrates clinical diagnosis of the site of brain tumors and performs the first successful intercranial surgery.
 Patrick Manson begins studying filariasis infection in humans.
 Meharry Medical College founded in Nashville, Tennessee as the Medical Department of Central Tennessee College; it is the first medical school for African Americans in the Southern United States.

Technology
 February 14 – Scottish American inventor Alexander Graham Bell and American electrical engineer Elisha Gray each file a patent for the telephone, initiating the Elisha Gray and Alexander Bell telephone controversy.
 March 7 – Alexander Graham Bell is granted a patent for the telephone.
 March 10 – Alexander Graham Bell makes the first successful bi-directional telephone call, saying "Mr. Watson, come here, I want to see you".
 April – Joseph Zentmayer makes his Centennial microscope in the United States.
 Nicolaus Otto builds the first successful four-stroke engine using the Otto cycle.
 Francis Edgar Stanley of Newton, Massachusetts, patents an atomizing paint distributor, a form of airbrush.
 The Seth Thomas Clock Company is awarded a United States patent for an adjustable wind-up alarm clock.
 Thomas Hawksley first uses pressure grouting to control water leakage under an embankment dam at Tunstall Reservoir in Weardale, County Durham, England.

Institutions
 October 4 – First classes begin at the Agricultural and Mechanical College of Texas.
 Elizabeth Bragg becomes the first woman to graduate with a civil engineering degree in the United States, from University of California, Berkeley.

Awards
 Copley Medal: Claude Bernard
 Wollaston Medal: Thomas Henry Huxley

Births
 January 5 – Lucien Bull (died 1972), Irish-born pioneer in chronophotography.
 January 23 – Otto Diels (died 1954), German Nobel Prize winner in chemistry.
 February 15 – E. H. "Chinese" Wilson (died 1930), English-born plant collector.
 April 22 – Robert Bárány (died 1936), Viennese-born Nobel Prize winner in medicine.
 June 13 – William Sealy Gosset (died 1937), English statistician.
 October 3 – Gabrielle Howard née Matthaei (died 1930), English-born plant physiologist.
 November 9 – Hideyo Noguchi (died 1928), Japanese bacteriologist.
 November 19 – Tatyana Afanasyeva (died 1964), Russian-born mathematician.
 November 25 – Paul Nitsche (executed 1948) Nazi German psychiatrist and eugenicist.

Deaths
 November 26 – Karl Ernst von Baer (born 1792), Baltic German naturalist.
 Undated – Anna Volkova (born 1800), Russian chemist.

References

 
19th century in science
1870s in science